Claire's Knee  is a 1970 French romantic drama film written and directed by Éric Rohmer. The film follows a soon-to-be married man and his infatuation with a teenage girl, specifically her knee. It is the fifth film in the series of the Six Moral Tales.

Plot
The story happens between 29 June and 29 July, presumably in 1970. Intertitles of the dates are displayed before the daily events are shown.

While holidaying at Lake Annecy on the eve of his wedding, career diplomat Jérôme accidentally meets up with Aurora, an old personal friend. Through Aurora, he meets Aurora's landlady, Madame Walter, and Laura, Madame Walter's youngest teenage daughter. Observant Aurora detects Laura's crush on Jérôme, and advises Jérôme of such. After Jérôme and Laura take a hike in the mountains together, she confesses that she is "a little in love with" Jérôme.

Days later (on 8 July), Laura's attractive older step-sister Claire arrives. Upon seeing Claire's knee while she is on a ladder, Jérôme finds himself longing to touch it, but he controls his temptation. Eventually an opportunity presents itself during a boat trip on the lake when Jérôme and Claire have to seek shelter in a hut from an approaching storm. Jérôme tells Claire that he saw her boyfriend, Gilles, together with another girl, Muriel. When Claire starts to cry Jérôme consoles her by placing his hand upon Claire's knee. Jérôme later delightedly tells Aurora that it had taken him great courage to touch Claire's knee and that doing so has exorcised his desire of her from him. Gilles returns and tries to give Claire excuses as to why he was with Muriel.

Cast 
 Jean-Claude Brialy as Jérôme Montcharvin, the diplomat
 Aurora Cornu as Aurora, the novelist
 Béatrice Romand as Laura, the younger step-sister
 Laurence de Monaghan as Claire, the elder step-sister
 Michèle Montel as Madame Walter, the mother of Laura
 Gérard Falconetti as Gilles
 Fabrice Luchini as Vincent

Reception
Claire's Knee received the Louis Delluc Prize for Best French film of the year, the 1971 Prix Méliès and the Grand Prix at the San Sebastián International Film Festival. It was named Best Film by the National Society of Film Critics and Best Foreign Film by the National Board of Review. It was nominated for Best Foreign Language Film at the Golden Globe Awards.

The film was a huge critical success. On the review aggregator website Rotten Tomatoes, Claire's Knee hold an approval rating of 96%, based on 23 critic reviews with an average rating of 8.3/10. The site's consensus reads: "Told through precise body language and sunny wit, Claire's Knee makes an unusual love story feel universal".

Vincent Canby of The New York Times called it "something close to a perfect film". Cecile Mury of Télérama said: "This camera outdoors gives the appearance of a small story where it goes 'nothing'. Yet these 'fragments of a love speech' make up a special study of desire, verbal pleasure, almost literary, which accompanies every inclination. A jewel".

Style
It was Rohmer's second film shot in color, with Rohmer explaining "the presence of the lake and the mountains is stronger in color than in black and white. It is a film I couldn't imagine in black and white. The color green seems to me essential in that film...This film would have no value to me in black and white".

References

External links
 
 
 
 
 Claire's Knee: Rohmer's Women an essay by Molly Haskell at the Criterion Collection
 On Claire's Knee by Daniel Hayes

1970 films
1970s teen drama films
Films directed by Éric Rohmer
French drama films
Louis Delluc Prize winners
Annecy
Films produced by Barbet Schroeder
Columbia Pictures films
1970 drama films
National Society of Film Critics Award for Best Film winners
1970s French-language films
1970s French films